The Dizengoff Prize for Painting and Sculpture is awarded annually by the Tel Aviv-Yafo Municipality since 1937.

Recipients 
The following is a table of Dizengoff Prize laureates in their respective art form:

References

Israeli art
Israeli culture
Israeli awards
Arts awards in Israel
Lists of Israeli award winners
Awards by the municipality of Tel Aviv-Yafo
Awards established in 1937